Role-playing game system
 Video game system, another name for video game console